Neovenator (nee-o-ven-a-tor meaning "new hunter") is a genus of carcharodontosaurian theropod dinosaur. It is known from several skeletons found in the Early Cretaceous (Barremian~130-125 million years ago) Wessex Formation on the south coast of the Isle of Wight, southern England. It is one of the best known theropod dinosaurs from the Early Cretaceous of Europe.

Discovery and species  
 
The first bones of Neovenator were discovered in the summer of 1978, when a storm made part of the Grange Chine collapse. Rocks containing fossils fell to the beach of Brighstone Bay on the southwestern coast of the Isle of Wight. The rocks consisted of plant debris bed L9 within the variegated clays and marls of the Wessex Formation dating from the Barremian stage of the Early Cretaceous, about 125 million years ago. They were first collected by the Henwood family and shortly afterwards by geology student David Richards. Richards sent the remains to the Museum of Isle of Wight (now Dinosaur Isle) and the British Museum of Natural History. In the latter institution paleontologist Alan Jack Charig determined that the bones belonged to two kinds of animal: Iguanodon and some theropod. The "Iguanodon", later referred to Mantellisaurus and ultimately made the separate genus Brighstoneus, generated the most interest and in the early 1980s a team was sent by the BMNH to secure more of its bones. On that occasion an additional theropod tail vertebra was discovered.

Several amateur paleontologists, among them Keith and Jenny Simmonds, now began to search for additional remains of the predator. Ultimately, the total of secured bones included the snout, teeth, a front lower jaw, most of the vertebral column, ribs, belly ribs, chevrons, the left shoulder girdle, pelvis bones and a hindlimb. These were accessioned under numbers BMNH R10001 and MIWG 6348. They equalled approximately 70% of the skeleton. In 1985, excavations undertaken by Steve Hutt of the MIWG revealed two vertebrae of a second individual, specimen MIWG.5470. In 1987, Jenny Simmonds found a third skeleton, containing vertebra and pelvic bones, specimen MIWG.6352.  A fourth individual found by Nick Oliver is represented by specimen IWCMS 2002.186, consisting of a lower jaw, parts of the cervical vertebrae and limb elements.  In 1990 the material, then considered a possible new species of Megalosaurus, was provisionally described by Hutt. Having mistaken the ischium of MIWG 6352 for a pubic bone, Hutt suggested this specimen represented a separate species.

In 1996, Steve Hutt, David Martill and Michael Barker named and described the type species Neovenator salerii. The generic name Neovenator means "new hunter" from the Greek neo~, "new" and Latin venator, "hunter". The specific name salerii honours the land owners of the site, the Salero family. In view of the large number of individuals involved in the discovery process, it was considered improper to single out one of them as discoverer. The holotype is the skeleton accessioned as BMNH R10001 and MIWG 6348.

In 1999, Hutt dedicated his (unpublished) master thesis to Neovenator.

In 2008, Stephen Louis Brusatte, Roger Benson and Hutt redescribed the species in great detail.<ref name="Brusatte2008">{{cite journal | last1 = Brusatte | first1 = S.L. | last2 = Benson | first2 = R.B.J. | last3 = Hutt | year = 2008 | title = The osteology of Neovenator salerii (Dinosauria: Theropoda) from the Wealden Group (Barremian) of the Isle of Wight | journal = Monograph of the Palaeontographical Society | volume = 162 | issue = 631| page = 166 }}</ref>

In 2012, teeth indistinguishable from those of the holotype of Neovenator were found in the Angeac lignitic bone bed, France, dating to the Barremian.

 Description 
Other. Palaeontographical Society, Palaeontographical Society Monographs 162 (631).

The various scientific descriptions of Neovenator have indicated some distinguishing traits. The nostril is twice as long as it is high. The praemaxilla in the snout bears five teeth. The maxilla is pierced by a large maxillary fenestra, the diameter of which equals a sixth of the length of the tooth row. The tooth crown equals a quarter of the tooth length, thus including the root. The toe claws have a groove on top. Both praemaxillae are connected by an extra pen-in-socket connection. The front joint surface of the intercentrum of the axis, the second neck vertebra, is transversely widened. The odontoid process of the axis has small openings along the side edge of the front facet. The neural process of the axis has a single small opening in the side. The rear neck vertebrae are fused with their neck ribs. On the eighth and ninth neck vertebrae, at the parapophysis, the lower rib joint facet, the internal camellate structure of the bone is visible. At the front neck vertebrae the undersides are formed as sharp keels which are not inset from the lateral sides. At the front back vertebrae, the hypapophyses, the lower swellings of the front facet edges, are formed like low mounds. On the rear back vertebrae the facets of the joint processes are continued sideways as curved flanges. The shoulder joint is wider transversely than long, measured from the front to the rear. The notch on the underside of the front blade of the ilium has a shelf at the inner side. The "feet" of the ischia are connected at their fronts but diverge at their rears. The head of the thighbone is obliquely directed to the front, to above and to the inside. On the thighbone the lesser trochanter has a robust ridge on its outer side. On the thighbone the fourth trochanter has a depression in the form of a thumbprint located to the outside of its upper limit. The front underside of the thighbone is nearly flat, only showing a short vertical groove between the lower condyles. The lower shinbone shows an oval rough area at the inner side. The top of the outer malleolus of the shinbone is pinched from the front to the rear. The outer front bulge of the top surface of the shinbone has a spur pointing to below. In the foot, the outer side of the second metatarsal has a hollow surface to contact the third metatarsal.

Several traits that once were thought to be unique or apomorphic for Neovenator, subsequent research showed to have been shared by other theropods. The nostrils are large but not uncommonly so. Having pneumatised rear back vertebrae is normal for carcharodontosaurids. Elevated paired nasal crests are shared with Allosaurus. Denticles continuing over the tooth apex are today known from other species.

In 2015, it was reported that the front of the snout of Neovenator contains a complex system of neurovascular canals, functioning as sensory organs. This trait is also known from Spinosauridae and was there explained as an adaptation for searching prey in water. It was doubted, however, whether Neovenator used its system for the same purpose.

 Classification 
At the time that it was described, by Steve Hutt, Martill and Barker in 1996, it was considered the only known allosaurid in Europe. However, further studies suggested it had more in common with the advanced carcharodontosaurid group of allosaurs, and several studies including a detailed examination of the species by Benson, Carrano and Brusatte in 2010 suggest that it is closely related to the Carcharodontosauridae (in a group called Carcharodontosauria), but is actually closer to the megaraptorans, together with them forming the family Neovenatoridae. Other studies have supported Neovenator being a carcharodontosaurid, and megaraptorans being tyrannosauroids.
 
  
The cladogram below follows the 2010 analysis by Benson, Carrano and Brusatte.

Cladogram after Novas et al., 2013

 Palaeobiology 
 Senses  
 
Chris Barker and colleagues suggested that Neovenator may have possessed integumentary sensory organs on its snout, much as modern waterfowl and crocodilians use to find food in muddy water, based on neurovascular structures found on the skull. As Neovenator is believed to be completely terrestrial, unlike the modern species, it is assumed that these sensory organs were used for other purposes, such as sensitivity to pressure and temperature, controlling jaw pressure and precision feeding. In support of this, the tooth wear for Neovenator seems to indicate that it avoided eating or biting into bone while it fed. Additionally, Neovenator might have used these integumentary sensory organs in courtship and sensing nest conditions, a technique seen today in most species of crocodilians and megapode birds. Though such structures are known for another theropod, the tyrannosaurid Daspletosaurus horneri, Neovenators neurovascular structures that likely supported these organs are the best preserved and most complete in any known theropod yet discovered. However, a more recent study reviewing the evolution of the trigeminal canals among sauropsids notes that a much denser network of neurovascular canals in the snout and lower jaw is more commonly encountered in aquatic or semiaquatic taxa (e.g., Spinosaurus, Halszkaraptor, Plesiosaurus), and taxa that developed a rhamphotheca (e.g., Caenagnathasia), while terrestrial taxa such as tyrannosaurids and Neovenator may have had average facial sensitivity for non-edentulous terrestrial theropods, although further research is needed.

 Palaeopathology 

The holotype of Neovenator salerii had many pathologies. The authors of the genus list them as "midcaudal vertebrae fusions, healed fractures of mid-caudal vertebra transverse processes; osteophytes affecting pedal phalanges, healed gastralia rib fractures, some forming false joints... [and] scapula fracture."

 Palaeoecology 
Fossil remains of Neovenator have been found on the Isle of Wight off southern England, and were first discovered in the 20th century. Neovenator perhaps existed alongside other dinosaurs found in the Wessex Formation of the early Cretaceous period, such as Ceratosuchops, Riparovenator, Baryonyx, Polacanthus, Iguanodon and Eotyrannus. The holotype bones were mixed with those of the herbivorous iguanodontian Brighstoneus and in the dig site also remains of fishes, amphibians, lizards, pterosaurs and Goniopholididae were present. Neovenator'' was likely the apex predator of its ecosystem.

References

External links 
 
 Neovenator at DinoWight
 Dinosaur Isle on Neovenator
 Fossil pieces of Neovenator

Neovenatorids
Early Cretaceous dinosaurs of Europe
Hauterivian life
Barremian life
Cretaceous United Kingdom
Fossils of England
Fossil taxa described in 1996